The 2015 Western Illinois Leathernecks football team represented Western Illinois University in the 2015 NCAA Division I FCS football season. They were led by third year head coach Bob Nielson and played their home games at Hanson Field. They were a member of the Missouri Valley Football Conference. They finished the season 7–6, 5–3 in MVFC play to finish in a three way tie for third place. They received an at-large bid to the FCS playoffs where they defeated Dayton in the first round before losing in the second round to fellow MVFC member Illinois State.

On December 14, head coach Bob Nielson resigned to become the head coach at fellow MVFC member South Dakota. He finished at Western Illinois with a three year record of 16–21.

Schedule

Source: Schedule

Ranking movements

References

Western Illinois
Western Illinois Leathernecks football seasons
Western Illinois
Western Illinois Leathernecks football